The diocese of Garba is a suppressed and titular see of the Roman Catholic Church.

History
During the Vandal Kingdom and the Roman Empire, Garba, was a civitas of the Roman province of Numidia, that is identifiable with the ruins at Aïn-Garb in today's Algeria. The town of Garba was also the seat of an ancient Christian episcopal seat.
 

There are three Bishops of Garba known to history.
 Bishop Victor the Donatist took part in the Council of Cirta in 305; 
At the Conference of Carthage of 411 between the Catholic and Donatist the town was represented by the Donatist Felix, who had no Catholic counterpart.
 Another Felix, this time a Catholic participated in the synod assembled in Carthage in 484 by the Vandal King Huneric, Felix was then exiled at the end of the council.

Today Garba survives only as a titular bishopric of the Roman Catholic Church and the current bishop is Mark S. Edwards, auxiliary bishop of Melbourne.

References

Numidia (Roman provinces)
Catholic titular sees in Africa